Steve Ryan is an American football coach and former football player. He is the head football coach at Morningside College in Sioux City, Iowa, a position he has held since the 2002 season. Ryan has led the Morningside Mustangs to three NAIA Football National Championships, in 2018, 2019, and 2021.

Ryan graduated from Wheaton College in Wheaton, Illinois in 1989 with his undergraduate degree, where he was a four-time letter winner and three-year starter for the Thunder. He earned a master's degree in 1997 from National Louis University. Prior to his hiring at Morningside, Ryan served as an assistant coach at Ottawa University in Ottawa, Kansas.

Coaching career
Ryan took over as the head coach in 2002 and led the Morningside Mustangs to a 5–5 season.  That inaugural season was considered a success as the Mustangs ended a streak of 15 consecutive losing seasons.  Ryan has had only one losing season, 2003.  Since that year, the Mustangs have appeared in the NAIA playoffs for 12  straight seasons, including the championship game in 2012.  They have lost no more than three contests in any season since 2003.

In 2018, Ryan led the Mustangs to an undefeated, 15-0 season, culminating with a national championship win over the Benedictine Ravens.  It was the first national championship for both the Mustangs and Ryan.

Head coaching record

See also
 List of college football coaches with 200 wins

References

External links
 Morningside profile

Date of birth missing (living people)
Year of birth missing (living people)
Living people
American football linebackers
Morningside Mustangs football coaches
Ottawa Braves football coaches
Wheaton Thunder football players
National Louis University alumni